PLHS may refer to the following schools in the United States: 
 Papillion-La Vista Senior High School, Papillion, Nebraska
 Pequot Lakes High School, Pequot Lakes, Minnesota
 Prior Lake High School, San Diego, California
 Pompton Lakes High School, Pompton Lakes, New Jersey
 Prior Lake High School, Savage, Minnesota
 Pyramid Lake High School, Nixon, Nevada